Alfond Stadium at Harper-Shepherd Field is a multi-purpose stadium in Winter Park, Florida. It is home to the Rollins Tars baseball and softball teams. The stadium was home to the Winter Park Diamond Dawgs wood bat collegiate summer baseball league team from 2004 to 2015.

The stadium is named for Harold Alfond, a longtime Rollins College booster. The land was donated it to the City of Winter Park in 1926 by local merchants James E. Harper and F.W. Shepherd. Rollins obtained the property in 1933.

Past renovations included the clubhouse in 1983 and in 2002; a new scoreboard in 2004; and updated lighting in 2012. 2018 improvements include a FieldTurf infield; safety netting; covered batting cages; a JV locker room; and a newly paved parking lot with new lighting. 2019 renovations will include improvements to the stadium and clubhouse.

In 2014 the site was considered for a new ballpark to host the Brevard County Manatees (Class A-Advanced; Florida State League) but the financial details didn't work out.

References

External links 
Rollins College

College baseball venues in the United States
Rollins Tars baseball
Multi-purpose stadiums in the United States
Sports venues in Greater Orlando
Buildings and structures in Winter Park, Florida
Baseball venues in Florida